Roar Grønvold (born 19 March 1946) is a former speed skater from Norway.

Grønvold had his best year in 1972 when he became Norwegian Allround Champion and won silver at the Norwegian Sprint Championships. In addition, he won silver at the 1972 Winter Olympics of Sapporo on both the 1,500 m and the 5,000 m, and he won silver at both the European Allround and the World Allround Championships. All four of those Olympic, World, and European silver medals were behind Ard Schenk.

In 1973, Grønvold joined the short-lived professional league, winning bronze at the Professional World Allround Championships that year and silver at the Professional European Allround Championships. At both those championships, it was again Ard Schenk who won the gold medals. In 1974, Grønvold again won silver at the Professional European Allround Championships, this time behind fellow Norwegian Bjørn Tveter. The professional league was dissolved that same year and that also meant the end of Grønvold's skating career. After his speed skating career ended, Grønvold became a speed skating coach.

Medals
An overview of medals won by Grønvold at important championships he participated in, listing the years in which he won each:

Personal records
To put these personal records in perspective, the WR column lists the official world records on the dates that Grønvold skated his personal records.

Grønvold has an Adelskalender score of 170.037 points. His highest ranking on the Adelskalender was a fifth place.

References

External links

 Roar Grønvold. Deutsche Eisschnelllauf Gemeinschaft e.V. (German Skating Association).
 Personal records from Jakub Majerski's Speedskating Database
 Evert Stenlund's Adelskalender pages
 Historical World Records. International Skating Union.
 National Championships results. Norges Skøyteforbund (Norwegian Skating Association).

1946 births
Living people
Norwegian male speed skaters
Olympic speed skaters of Norway
Olympic silver medalists for Norway
Speed skaters at the 1968 Winter Olympics
Speed skaters at the 1972 Winter Olympics
Olympic medalists in speed skating
Medalists at the 1972 Winter Olympics
Norwegian speed skating coaches
World Allround Speed Skating Championships medalists